Dischistodus pseudochrysopoecilus, commonly known as the monarch damsel, is a species of fish found in the western-central Pacific Ocean.

References

pseudochrysopoecilus
Fish described in 1974
Taxa named by Gerald R. Allen
Taxa named by David Ross Robertson